In total, 72 governors of a U.S. state have been born outside the current territory of the United States. Joe Lombardo of Nevada, born in Japan, is the only current governor to have been born outside the United States. Arnold Schwarzenegger of California, Jennifer Granholm of Michigan (whose terms both ended in January 2011), and Kate Brown of Oregon (whose term ended in January 2023) are the other  most recent foreign-born governors.

Of the fifty states, 30 (or 60 percent) have had at least one governor born outside the United States. 19 states have had multiple governors who were born outside the United States. Georgia has had six foreign-born governors, who all served in office during the 18th century. The other states with the most foreign-born governors are Wisconsin (five), Michigan, Minnesota, North Dakota, Ohio, and Oregon (four each). Additionally, from 1905 to 1921 Utah had three consecutive foreign-born governors (John Cutler, William Spry, and Simon Bamberger).

Of the 72 foreign-born governors, 59 were born in Europe and thirteen were born in North America, including the Caribbean. A total of 30 U.S. governors have been born on the present territory of the United Kingdom of Great Britain and Northern Ireland (fifteen in England, seven in Scotland, six in Northern Ireland, and two in Wales), with another 2  born on territory of the Republic of Ireland while part of the United Kingdom of Great Britain and Ireland, and 2 while part of the pre-union Kingdom of Ireland. Nine governors have been born within the present territory of Canada, seven Germany, five Norway, five Sweden, three France, three Mexico, and one Austria.

Only three foreign-born women have served as U.S. governors – Madeleine Kunin of Vermont, who was born in Switzerland; Jennifer Granholm of Michigan, who was born in Canada; and Kate Brown of Oregon, who was born in Spain.

List
Governors who were succeeded by another foreign-born governor are marked with a dagger (†). Governors who were preceded by another foreign-born governor are marked with a section sign (§).

By birthplace

By state

See also
List of United States senators born outside the United States
Natural-born-citizen clause (United States)

References

See also
 List of current United States governors
 List of female governors in the United States
 List of minority governors and lieutenant governors in the United States
 List of United States Senators born outside the United States

 Born outside the United States
American people by ethnic or national origin